Gavin M. Mudd is an associate professor in the Department of Environmental Engineering at RMIT University, Australia.  He was awarded a Ph.D. in environmental engineering in 2001, from the Victoria University of Technology.  Mudd's research interests include environmental impacts, management of mine wastes, acid mine drainage, sustainability frameworks, life-cycle assessment modelling and mine rehabilitation.

In October 2007, Gavin Mudd completed a report on Australia's Mining Industry entitled The Sustainability of Mining in Australia: Key Production Trends and Their Environmental Implications for the Future.

Selected recent publications

Sustainability of Uranium Mining and Milling: Toward Quantifying Resources and Eco-Efficiency
Global Trends in Gold Mining : Towards Quantifying Environmental and Resource Sustainability? Resources Policy, 32 (1–2), 2007, pp 42–56.
Gold Mining in Australia : Linking Historical Trends and Environmental and Resource Sustainability, Environmental Science and Policy, 10 (7–8), 2007, pp 629–644.
An Analysis of Historic Production Trends in Australian Base Metal Mining, Ore Geology Reviews, 32 (1–2), 2007, pp 227–261.
An Assessment of the Sustainability of the Mining Industry in Australia Australian Journal of Multi-Disciplinary Engineering, 5 (1), 2007, pp 1–12.

See also
Mining in Australia
Mark Diesendorf
Nuclear industry in South Australia
Uranium mining in Australia

References

Further reading 

Living people
Sustainability advocates
Year of birth missing (living people)
Academic staff of Monash University
Place of birth missing (living people)
Victoria University, Melbourne alumni